Sirajul Islam Bhuiyan is a Jatiya Party (Ershad) politician and the former Member of Parliament of Madaripur-2.

Career
Bhuiyan was elected to parliament from Madaripur-2 as a Jatiya Party candidate in 1988.

References

Jatiya Party politicians
Living people
4th Jatiya Sangsad members
Year of birth missing (living people)